The NRL Nines  is a rugby league nines competition, normally held during the NRL preseason each year. It was initially held in Auckland, New Zealand, between 2014 and 2017 before going on hiatus. Returning in 2020, hosting duties moved to Perth, Western Australia.

Competition Format

Auckland (2014–2017) 
Two national women's teams compete in one section of the tournament and sixteen NRL club men's teams compete in the other. Each of the men's squad must include at least 12 of their top 25 players in their squad, and at least one marquee player. The winner of the men's tournament received AUD$500,000 with a total prize pool of AUD$2,250,000. In the first four editions, the competition has had eight different finalists and four different winners, though the 2016 title was later stripped from the Parramatta Eels for breaching the salary cap.

Since 2015 the Kiwiferns and the Jillaroos also competed in a three-game series, with the Kiwiferns winning the series 2-1. These games are played during the final stages of the men's tournament and allow the male players more of a break between their games while providing a broader tournament. Also in 2015, the pools were given traditional Maori names that were chosen by a public vote and were: Rangitoto, Waiheke, Piha and Hunua Ranges.

Perth (2020) 
The women's teams were NRL Women's Premiership sides instead of national teams.

Series Cancellations (2021–2022) 
The 2021 series was cancelled entirely, not due to the COVID-19 pandemic in Australia, but due to an overly-crowded preseason schedule. 

The NRL released the 2022 fixtures list in November 2021, with the season due to start in March 2022. The list included no mention of the World Club Challenge or NRL Nines competitions.  As of 29 April 2022, the NRL has not made any official comment on whether this competition will go ahead.

Rules
There are a number of rule variations that are implemented to ensure the games are faster and to ensure fewer delays and stoppages.

The major rule changes that differ from regular NRL games are:
 Two nine-minute halves with a two-minute half time period.
 Nine players a side with five unlimited interchange players (six interchanges in 2014).
 Scrums are only formed after a double knock on, with attacking teams electing which side to feed the ball.
 No video referee, with one on-field referee, two touch judges and two in-goal judges.
 Five minute golden try period in qualifying rounds with the match deemed a draw if there is no score, while unlimited golden try for the finals.
 A tap restart takes place after a 40/20.
 Five points for a try scored in the bonus zone under the posts, with two point drop kick conversion attempts.
 The scoring team will have a drop-kick kick-off at the half way mark to restart play.
 Three minute sin bins (Five in 2014).
 Five tackles in a set.

Finals
Note – The Parramatta Eels were stripped of their 2016 Auckland Nines title due to a breach of the NRL salary cap. The 2016 title was withheld by the NRL rather than awarding it to the runners up.

Men's

Team Performance

Women's

Team Performance

Women's Series
From 2015 to 2017, the New Zealand Kiwi Ferns and the Australia Jillaroos played a three match series, as the NRL Women's Premiership had not yet been formed. The NRL Women's competition was formed in 2018, and in 2020 the structure of the Women's competition changed to a club competition similar to the Men's.

Sponsorship
Since 2001, the National Rugby League premiership has been sponsored by Downer Group and known as the 'NRL Telstra Premiership'. Subsequently, the competition was simply known as the 'Dick Smith NRL Nines', being sponsored by the Australasian electronics retail chain until 2016.

See also

Rugby League World Sevens
Super League World Nines
Rugby League World Cup 9s

References

External links

 
National Rugby League
Rugby league nines
Rugby league in Auckland
Recurring sporting events established in 2014
Recurring sporting events disestablished in 2017
2014 establishments in New Zealand
2017 disestablishments in New Zealand